David Director Friedman (born February 12, 1945) is an American economist, physicist, legal scholar, author, and anarcho-capitalist theorist. Although he studied chemistry and physics and not law or economics, he is known for his textbook writings on microeconomics and the libertarian theory of anarcho-capitalism, which is the subject of his most popular book, The Machinery of Freedom. Described by Walter Block as a "free-market anarchist" theorist, Friedman has also authored several other books and articles, including Price Theory: An Intermediate Text (1986), Law's Order: What Economics Has to Do with Law and Why It Matters (2000), Hidden Order: The Economics of Everyday Life (1996), and Future Imperfect (2008).

Life and work
David Friedman is the son of economists Rose and Milton Friedman. He graduated magna cum laude from Harvard University in 1965, with a bachelor's degree in chemistry and physics. He later earned a master's (1967) and a PhD (1971) in theoretical physics from the University of Chicago. Despite his later career, he never took a class for credit in either economics or law. He was a professor of law at Santa Clara University from 2005 to 2017, and a contributing editor for Liberty magazine. He is currently a Professor Emeritus. He is an atheist. His son, Patri Friedman, has also written about libertarian theory and market anarchism, particularly seasteading.

The Machinery of Freedom

In his book The Machinery of Freedom (1973), Friedman sketched a form of anarcho-capitalism where all goods and services including law itself can be produced by the free market.  Friedman advocates an incrementalist approach to achieve anarcho-capitalism by gradual privatization of areas that government is involved in, ultimately privatizing the law itself. In the book, he states his opposition to violent anarcho-capitalist revolution.

He advocates a consequentialist version of anarcho-capitalism, arguing for it on a cost-benefit analysis of state versus no state. It is contrasted with the natural-rights approach as propounded most notably by economist and libertarian theorist Murray Rothbard.

Non-academic interests
Friedman is a longtime member of the Society for Creative Anachronism, where he is known as Duke Cariadoc of the Bow. He is known throughout the worldwide society for his articles on the philosophy of recreationism and practical historical recreations, especially those relating to the medieval Middle East. His work is compiled in the popular Cariadoc's Miscellany. He is sometimes credited with founding the largest and longest-running SCA event, the Pennsic War; as king of the Middle Kingdom he challenged the East Kingdom, and later as king of the East accepted the challenge and lost (to himself).

He was a teenage wargamer who taught his school friend, Jack Radey, founder of People's War Games, how to play such wargames as Tactics II. Radey relates how Friedman and himself wrote to Charles S. Roberts claiming that they had found a first turn winning strategy for each of the two sides. Roberts replied that their interpretation of the rules was valid.

He is a long-time science fiction fan, and has written two fantasy novels, Harald (Baen Books, 2006) and Salamander (2011).

He has spoken in favor of a non-interventionist foreign policy.

Bibliography

Nonfiction 
 1988. Cariadoc's Miscellany.
 1990 (2nd ed.; 1st ed.: 1986). Price Theory: An Intermediate Text. Southwestern Publishing.
 1996. Hidden Order: The Economics of Everyday Life. .
 2000. Law's Order: What Economics Has to Do with Law and Why It Matters. Princeton Univ. Press. 
 2005. "The Case for Privacy" in Contemporary Debates in Applied Ethics. Wiley-Blackwell. 
 2008. Future Imperfect: Technology and Freedom in an Uncertain World. 
 2015 (3rd ed.; 2nd ed.: 1989; 1st ed.: 1973). The Machinery of Freedom. 
 2019. Legal Systems Very Different from Ours.

Fiction 
 
 Salamander, 2011
 Brothers, 2020

References

External links

 
 
 Profile on the website of Santa Clara University
 
 Booknotes interview with Friedman on Hidden Order: The Economics of Everyday Life, October 20, 1996.
 

1945 births
Living people
20th-century American economists
20th-century American male writers
20th-century American non-fiction writers
20th-century American novelists
20th-century American physicists
20th-century American poets
20th-century atheists
21st-century American economists
21st-century American male writers
21st-century American non-fiction writers
21st-century American novelists
21st-century American physicists
21st-century American poets
21st-century atheists
American anarcho-capitalists
Jewish American atheists
American economics writers
American legal scholars
American libertarians
American male bloggers
American bloggers
American male non-fiction writers
American male novelists
American male poets
American people of Austrian-Jewish descent
American people of Hungarian-Jewish descent
American people of Ukrainian-Jewish descent
American political philosophers
American political writers
Chicago School economists
Consequentialists
Free-market anarchists
Friedman family
Harvard College alumni
Jewish American novelists
Jewish American poets
Jewish American social scientists
Jewish physicists
Legal educators
Libertarian economists
Libertarian theorists
Non-interventionism
Philosophers of economics
Philosophy writers
Santa Clara University School of Law faculty
University of Chicago alumni
Usenet people
Wargamers
Member of the Mont Pelerin Society